Antonio Cipriano (born May 13, 2000) is an Italian American actor and singer. He made his Broadway debut in 2019 playing Phoenix in the musical Jagged Little Pill, a role he originated at the American Repertory Theater. On screen, he has made appearances in television series such as City on a Hill, The Sex Lives of College Girls, and the Disney+ series National Treasure: Edge of History.

Early life and education 
Antonio Cipriano was raised in Grosse Pointe, Michigan, in Metro Detroit. There, he attended University Liggett School from which he graduated in 2018. He was involved in numerous local and school theatre productions and was a member of the Michigan Opera Theatre Children's Chorus.

Career 

Cipriano's career began as a high schooler. He first found acclaim as the winner of the Sutton Foster Ovation Awards for Best Actor in May 2017 for his performance as Mickey McKee in Hello! My Baby; the award recognizes "outstanding achievement in individual artistry, vocal, dance and acting performances for a male lead in a high school musical theatre production." As a result, he represented Michigan at the 2017 National High School Musical Theater Awards (also known as the Jimmy Awards) and placed in the top four finalists out of the thirty-six male competitors.

In 2018, he was cast in the original Cambridge, Massachusetts, production of the musical Jagged Little Pill, inspired by the album of the same name by Alanis Morissette. The production played at American Repertory Theater for two-and-a-half months. In January 2019, it was announced the show would transfer to Broadway. In the interim, Cipriano appeared in a one-week Off-Broadway production of Carmelina at the York Theatre that same month. He also took part in the original reading of the stage adaption of The Notebook, with music by Ingrid Michaelson. Following previews of Jagged Little Pill, the production opened on Broadway in December 2019. The musical was nominated for fifteen Tony Awards, winning two. The production was paused in March 2020 due to the COVID-19 pandemic. Cipriano did not rejoin the production in September 2021 due in part to his stance on the controversy surrounding the musical's main character Jo, whose gender was changed from non-binary to cisgender for the Broadway version.

In October 2020, it was announced that Cipriano would start opposite Belle Shouse and Stephen Moyer in the supernatural horror series Safehaven. As of 2022, the show has not gone into production.

In January 2022, it was announced that Cipriano would be part of the main cast in the Disney+ series National Treasure: Edge of History, based on the National Treasure films.

Personal life 
As of June 2019, Cipriano dated fellow Broadway star Reneé Rapp. In December 2021, the pair split.

Stage credits

Filmography

Television

Music Video

References

External links

Antonio Cipriano at the Internet Broadway Database
Personal website

21st-century American male actors
American male musical theatre actors
American male stage actors
American male television actors
American male singers
Living people
2000 births